The 1952 San Juan earthquake took place on 11 June at 00:31:43 UTC in the province of San Juan, Argentina. The earthquake was felt in San Juan with a maximum of VIII (Severe) on the Mercalli intensity scale. It caused damage in some locations in the south and west of the province, and a small number of casualties.

See also
List of earthquakes in 1952
List of earthquakes in Argentina

References

External links
  Instituto Nacional de Prevención Sísmica. Listado de Terremotos Históricos.
 

1952
Earthquakes in San Juan Province, Argentina
San Juan, 1952
San Juan Earthquake, 1952
June 1952 events in South America